24seven, or 24seven Utility Services Ltd. was a utility management company that served over 5 million homes with electricity in the early part of the 21st century.

The company was created in 2000 to manage the electricity distribution networks in London and Eastern areas of the United Kingdom, by its parent companies, London Electricity and TXU Europe. The company was formed in response to tough price controls laid out by the UK energy regulator, OFGEM. It was believed that bringing the management of rival power networks under a single organization would yield economies of scale for its two shareholders.  The company had ambitions to run other utilities including water and gas networks. Whilst these ambitions remained largely unfulfilled, it is worth noting that some of the Directors and managers from 24seven now work at Thames Water.

24seven had a distinct orange and grey logo, with a verbose slogan ‘brilliant people running world class utility services’. Its white and orange vehicles became a familiar site around London and the surrounding area and even feature in the tableau of London streets in the popular model village Legoland.

The company was subsumed into LE Group in 2003 and then became part of EDF Energy, the UK branch of Électricité de France, before being acquired by Cheung Kong Holdings and renamed UK Power Networks.

References

Sources
 EDF Energy Website
 24seven launch press release
 Wilkommen bei 24seven

Utilities of the United Kingdom